St. Gabriel Church is a Roman Catholic parish in Stamford, Connecticut, part of the  Diocese of Bridgeport.

History 
This modern church dates from shortly after the founding of the parish in 1963.

References

External links 
 Diocese of Bridgeport
 http://saintgabrielchurch.org/

Roman Catholic churches in Stamford, Connecticut
Roman Catholic Diocese of Bridgeport